Sir Henry Hessey Johnston Gompertz (31 August 1867 – 4 February 1930) was a Puisne Judge in the Supreme Court, Hong Kong, and Chief Justice of the Federated Malay States.

Biography
Born on 31 August 1867, Gompertz was educated at Bedford School and at Exeter College, Oxford. He was called to the Bar, as a member of Lincoln's Inn, in 1899. He was a Puisne Judge in the Supreme Court, Hong Kong, between 1909 and 1925, and Chief Justice of the Federated Malay States, between 1925 and 1929.

Gompertz retired in 1929, and died in Alassio on 4 February 1930.

References

1867 births
1930 deaths
People educated at Bedford School
Alumni of Exeter College, Oxford
Members of Lincoln's Inn
Knights Bachelor
Lawyers awarded knighthoods
Federated Malay States judges
Justices of the Supreme Court of Hong Kong
British barristers